The following is a timeline of the history of the city of Arlington, Texas, USA.

Prior to 20th century

 1542 – Spanish explorers make camp in an Indian Village named Guasco at current-day Dottie Lynn Pkwy.
 1838 – Robert Sloan and Nathaniel T. Journey lead an expedition into present-day Euless and Arlington that was recorded as one of the first Anglo-American efforts to open the area to settlement.
 1841 – 
 General Edward H. Tarrant leads the Battle of Village Creek, killing many Native American people who called Village Creek their home.
 Captain Jonathan Bird creates Bird's Fort on the north side of present-day Arlington, Anglo-American's first attempt to settle in north Texas.
 1843 – Treaty of Bird's Fort, a peace treaty between Native Americans and the Republic of Texas opens the door to settlement in the entire region.
 1848 – "Father of Tarrant County" Colonel Middleton Tate Johnson's Company of Texas Rangers is assigned to Kaufman Station, later known as Johnson Station.
 1853 – Patrick A. Watson and a group of settlers arrive and settle on land that now borders the present Watson Road.
 1869 – Reverend Andrew Shannon Hayter arrives and organizes the Good Hope Cumberland Presbyterian Church.
 1870 – Colonel Middleton Tate Johnson's body is exhumed from Texas State Cemetery and buried in a family cemetery on Arkansas Lane.
 1871 – 
 United States Congress approved a charter for a transcontinental railroad, including Arlington, Texas.
 Elder John Quarles Burnett meets with 17 fellow Baptists and organizes the first church in Johnson Station - Johnson Station Baptist Church.
 1873 – Settlement founded near site of present-day city.
 1876 – 
 Texas and Pacific Railway established a stop mid-way between Dallas and Fort Worth in present-day Arlington.
 The town situated around the train stop is named "Hayterville" after Rev. Andrew Shannon Hayter.
 Carver Dixon "Uncle Dutch" King becomes the first mayor of Arlington.
 Johnson Station Baptist Church moves with the community three miles north, eventually becoming known as First Baptist Church of Arlington.
 1877 – 
 Settlement renamed "Arlington" (previously known as "Johnson" or "Hayter") at Rev. Hayter's request.
 Arlington, Texas is officially recognized by the United States Postal Service.
 1878 - 
 A group of Methodists meet in Schults' lumberyard at Mesquite and Front Streets and organize the first church congregation in Arlington's original township.
 Arlington landowner James Daniel Cooper builds a majestic colonial house on the corner of what is now Cooper St. and Abram St.
 1880 – U.S. Census shows a population of 275 people with eight general merchants, three drug stores, a lumber dealer, two physicians, a hotel keeper, a saloon operator and various other occupations including farming.
 1881 – M. J. Brinson becomes mayor for the first time.
 1883 – William Timmerman and Colonel Thomas Spruance establishes the city's first newspaper called "The World."
 1884 – Arlington officially incorporates as a city.
 1885 – 
 Edward Emmett Rankin becomes mayor for just a month.
 First church building in Arlington is built.
 1887 – Cemetery Society (later Arlington Historical Society) founded.
 1889 – M. J. Brinson becomes mayor for the second time.
 1891 – Rice Wood Collins, a successful merchant, starts public well campaign for access to water.

 1892 - “Christmas Eve Massacre” gunfight leaves four men and a horse dead on Main Street near the rail station.
 1893 - 
 The original mineral well is drilled by a wood-powered steam engine.
 McKinley-Woodward Home is built by Jesse Stanley McKinley, Arlington's first hardware merchant at 400 E. First. One of the oldest structures in the city.
 Arlington's first newspaper "The World" is renamed to "The Arlington Democrat."
 1895 – The city well becomes an official corner point for the city's four new political wards. The well was a focal point for political rallies, parades, cotton sales and the mineral water itself.
 1896 – 
 William W. McNatt, a merchant and farmer, sells a portion of his farm to sell lots for burial. Many Arlington pioneers are buried thereafter.
 Hutchison-Smith Home is built on 312 N. Oak, once owned by I. L. Hutchison, Arlington merchant and pioneer.
 1897
 Arlington Journal newspaper begins publication, changing its name from "The Arlington Democrat."
 Mount Olive Baptist congregation formed.
 1899 – Carver Dixon King becomes mayor for a second term lasting only two months.
 1900 – 
 William C. Weeks becomes mayor.
 Population: 1,079.

20th century

 1902 –
 Thomas Benton Collins becomes mayor of Arlington.
 North Texas Regional Interurban railway begins operating.
 Carlisle Military Academy established.
 Arlington residents vote for the town to remain dry.
 1903 – 
 Texas Legislative Act created the Arlington ISD. Local schools are taken over by the City of Arlington from Carlisle Military Academy.
 Southwestern Bell establishes service here.
 Berachah Industrial Home for the Redemption of Erring Girls opens.
 1904 – 
 T. G. Bailey becomes mayor.
 The city forms its first high school, and grades 8-11 met at South Side School.
 Texas & Pacific Railroad Depot is built.
 1905 – First high school class graduates in Arlington
 1906 – 
 William C. Weeks becomes mayor again.
 W. A. Thornton Home is built at 719 W. Abram, the first home in Arlington with gas lights.
 Ghormley-Arnold Home is built at 404 E. First for Dr. W. I. Ghormley.
 1907 – 
 Centenary Methodist Episcopal Church South, the first brick church opens on the N.E. corner of Center and Division Streets.
 Douglass-Potts Home located on 206 W. North is built.
 Vaught Home at 718 W. Abram is built for T. J. Trammell and purchased by Alex Vaught.
 1909 – 
 James Park Fielder Sr. becomes mayor for a short two months.
 Dr. William Harold Davis becomes mayor after Fielder.
 1910 – 
 Alton C. Barnes becomes mayor.
 The Commercial Club funds construction of a new mineral well where water flows through lions' heads mounted on a four-sided structure.
 Population: 1,794.

 1911 – Masonic Home for Aged Masons opens, now known as Texas Masonic Retirement Center.
 1912 – Rufus H. Greer becomes mayor of Arlington for the first time.
 1913 – John M. Elliott Home at 1210 W. Abram is built, an example of a hipped roof bungalow with classical influences.
 1914 – Historic Fielder House at 1616 W. Abram is built by prominent banker James Park Fielder.
 1915 – P.F. McKee becomes mayor.
 1916 – 
 Rufus H. Greer becomes mayor of Arlington for the second time.
 South Center Street Historic District is planned out by William Rose, housing the city's earliest merchants and craftsmen.
 Mayor William H., & Ollie Gibbins Rose Home at 501 S. Center is built as the first addition to South Center Street Historic District.
 1917 – 
 Arlington Military Academy becomes Grubbs Vocational College.
 Zachary Slaughter opens the city's first car dealership.
 Slaughter-Geer Home is built by Zack Slaughter for his father and stepmother at 505 S. Center.
 Wylie F. Altman opens the Altman Ladies Store in Arlington.
 1918 - Historic Dickerson Home at 400 N. Pecan is built by Martin Luther Dickerson, a cotton broker in Arlington and Ft. Worth.
 1919 – 
 William H. Rose becomes mayor, bringing with him progression such as city audits, ordinances, the first sidewalks, a modern water system and new businesses.
 Ransom Hall is built on Grubbs Vocational College campus at 602 S. West as the first administration building.
 1920 –
  Population: 3,031.
 Arlington adopts a home rule city charter.
 1921 – 
 The highway from Dallas to Arlington is widened and carries interstate traffic through the center of the city.
 Pulley Home on 201 E. North is built, exemplifying the asymmetrical bungalow architectural style.
 1922 – 
 Arlington High School built on Cooper St. and Abram St, the first official high school in AISD.
 Tarrant County starts the first public library in Arlington.
 1923 – 
 William Green Hiett becomes mayor of Arlington for the first time, during which the first paved roads were built.
 Grubbs Vocational College changes name to North Texas Agricultural College.
 Arlington Cemetery Association is chartered, taking care of Arlington Cemetery.
 1924 – 
 Meadowbrook Park opens as the first park in Arlington.
 Eastern Star Home is built to provide a home for aged and infirm members of the Eastern Star Organization in Texas at 1201 E. Division.
 1925 - Hugh Moore becomes mayor of Arlington for a year.

 1926 – 
 Elmer L. Taylor becomes mayor for a year.
 Top O' Hill Terrace changes ownership and converts facilities into an illegal casino.
 1927 – William Green Hiett becomes mayor of Arlington for the second time. 
 1928 – 
 The first car showroom is opened by the Thannisch Chevrolet Company on the edge of downtown.
 Construction for the Cooper Hotel begins at 300 N. Center.
 Preston Hall at 604 S. West is built as a science hall by North Texas Agriculture College.
 Old Mayor's House at 814 E. Abram is built by cattle broker Dave Martin, once owned by B. C. & Francine Barnes.
 1929 – 
 Arlington Downs horse-racing track opens.
 The Cooper Hotel celebrates its grand opening.
 W. J. Pulley opens Pulley Footwear.
 1930 – U.S. Census shows Arlington population at 3,700.
 1931 – John H. Pilant becomes mayor.
 1932 – O.S. Gray founded a pecan nursery on West Division Street. He develops and makes five varieties of pecan trees. 
 1933 – 
 W.L. Barrett becomes mayor of Arlington.
 Texas state legislature grants Arlington Downs the first legal parimutuel betting permit.
 1934 – Arlington Citizen newspaper begins publication.
 1935 – Wylie F. Altman becomes mayor through World War II.
 1936 – Berachah Industrial Home for the Redemption of Erring Girls reopens as an orphanage called Berachah Child Institute.
 1937 –
 Arlington Downs is sold to commercial developers due to the repeal of betting laws.
 North Side School opens, now known as Kooken Elementary School.
 1938 – 
 The interurban rail line serving Arlington ceases operations on Christmas Eve.
 T.W. (Hooker) Vandergriff purchases the Thannisch Chevrolet Company building and becomes the Thannisch-Vandergriff Bldg.
 1939 – Arlington Post Office is built by the Federal Works Agency on 200 W. Main St, now the Worthington National Bank Building.
 1940 – Population: 4,240.
 1941 – Mural Gathering Pecans by Otis Dozier is painted in the Arlington Post Office building.
 1942 – Berachah Child Institute orphanage ceases operations.
 Tom J. Vandergriff, Arlington's future revolutionary mayor, graduates from Arlington High School.
 1947 –
 B.C. Barnes becomes mayor of Arlington.
 Texas Rangers police bust the Top O' Hill Terrace illegal casino and speakeasy and shut it down permanently.
 Cosden Petroleum facility and St. Albans Episcopal Church opens.
 1949 – 
 The city adopts the city manager form of government.
 North Texas Agricultural College changes name to Arlington State College.
 1950 –
 Arlington Music Hall opens, originally as a walk-in theater.
 Colonial Apartments opens (approximate date).
 Population: 7,692.
 1951 – 
 Tom Vandergriff becomes mayor.
 The city's famous well on Main and Center is capped permanently under the intersection's pavement due to increased traffic.
 1952 –
 Sister city relationship established with Bad Königshofen, Germany.
 Grace Lutheran church opens.
 Texas & Pacific Railroad Depot is demolished.
 James Daniel Cooper's historical house is donated to the city and relocated to Meadowbrook Park, serving as a library.
 1953 – The city takes over the public library from Tarrant County.
 1954 –
 General Motors Corporation plant opens.
 Berry Elementary School opens.
 1955 – J.C. Penney and Sears chain stores in business.
 1956 –
American Can Company plant opens.
 Arlington Baptist College opens  on the property of the old speakeasy Top O' Hill Terrace. 
 Arlington High School moves to its second location on Park Row and Cooper. 
 Old Arlington High School building becomes Ousley Jr. High
Thornton Elementary School opens.
 1957 – Dallas-Fort Worth Turnpike opens.
 1958 – 
 Arlington Downs is completely destroyed by commercial developers.
 Vandergriff family donates land that becomes Arlington Memorial Hospital
1959 – The first candidates for a four-year bachelor's degree enroll at Arlington State College.
 1960 – Population: 44,775.
 1961 –
 City Hall opens.
 Six Flags Over Texas opens.
 Six Arlington High girls plunge off a bridge in what is now River Legacy Park, tragically killing half and sparking an urban legend called "The Screaming Bridge."
 1962 – 
 Public Library opens.
 Cooper House is leased to the Arlington Woman's Club who refurbished and maintained the home.
 1963 – 
 Silver Star Carousel debuts at Six Flags Over Texas, originally crafted in 1920s Philadelphia.
Sam Houston High School opens.
 1964 - 
 Arlington Municipal Airport opens. 
 Speelunker Cave opens as Six Flags Over Texas's first dark ride.
 Meadowbrook Recreation Center is built on the northern edge of Meadowbrook Park.
 1965 – 
 Turnpike Stadium opens.
 Dottie Lynn and Church Women United throw the first Annual 4 July parade.
 Vandergriff Chapel is built.
 Cooper House is designated as a Texas Historical Landmark.
 1966 – 
 Park Plaza Cinema opens.
 Runaway Mine Train coaster is built at Six Flags Over Texas.
 Thannisch-Vandergriff Bldg. closes as a car dealership after 38 years.
 1967 – Arlington State College becomes the modern University of Texas at Arlington.
 1968 – AISD sells the old Arlington High School/Ousley Jr. High building to UTA, and the School of Social Work opens.
 1970 –
 Forum 303 Mall and Six Flags Mall open.
 Arlington Genealogical Society formed.
 Lamar High School opens.
 Population: 90,643.
 1972 –
 Texas Rangers baseball team based in city.
 Seven Seas Marine Life Park opens.
 1973 –
 The Central Library moves to its first Abram Street location. 
 Theatre Arlington opens.
 Bowie High School opens.
 1974 – 
 Dallas/Fort Worth Regional Airport opens.
 Cheryl Calloway is found stabbed to death in the parking lot of Forum 303 Mall, one of Arlington's more infamous cold cases.
 1977 - S.J. Stovall becomes mayor of Arlington, forming the organization Leadership Arlington during his term.
 1976 – A monument for the famous Central St. Well is created in front of the Central Library.
 1979 – The Oakridge School opens.
 1980 –
 University of Texas at Arlington's Maverick Stadium open.
 Fielder House Museum opens.
 Population: 160,113.
 Judge Roy Scream opens as SFOT's first wooden rollercoaster.
 1981 – 
 Texas Historical Marker is installed and dedicated at Berachah Child Institute.
 Pantera is formed by Arlington teenagers Vinnie Abbott, Darrell Abbott, Terry Glaze, Tommy Bradford and Donnie Hart.
 1982 – 
 Martin High School opens.
 Texas Commerce Bank becomes the tallest building in the city.
 1983 – 
 Harold E. Patterson becomes mayor.
 Islamic Society Of Arlington founded.
 Bowie High School closes its original building on Arbrook Boulevard and becomes Workman Junior High School as a result.
 1985 – 
 Silver Star Carousel is removed from Six Flags Over Texas for a major restoration.
Joe Barton becomes U.S. representative for Texas's 6th congressional district.
 1987 – 
 Richard Greene becomes mayor, increasing funding for police and fire departments, developed plans for a new Texas Rangers ballpark, and led road construction programs.
 1988 – 
 River Legacy Foundation, a nonprofit 501 (c)(3), is formed as a public/private partnership with City of Arlington Parks and Recreation Department. 
 Silver Star Carousel opens back up at Six Flags Over Texas's park gate plaza, where it still operates.
The Parks at Arlington opens.
 1989 – Mount Olive Baptist Church is rebuilt at 402 N. West St.
 1990 – 
 Population: 261,721.
 Texas Giant opens at Six Flags over Texas, the tallest wooden rollercoaster in the world at the time.
 Elzie Odom becomes the first African-American elected to the Arlington City Council.
 1991 – 
 Tom J. Vandergriff is induced into the Texas Rangers Baseball Hall of Fame.
 S.J. Stovall Park Park opens at 2800 West Sublett Road.
 Bowie High School reopens and relocates on Highbank Drive.
 1992 - 
 Speelunker Cave at Six Flags Over Texas is replaced by dark ride Yosemite Sam & the Gold River adventure based on the Looney Tunes characters.
 The Witness Tree, an old post oak on the old Bardin Farm that grew to be 60 feet tall, is uprooted by Kmart and transplanted, where it later dies.
 1993 – 
 The commercial tree preservation ordinance is adopted by City Hall following outcry over the Witness Tree's uprooting.
 Voters authorize the formation of single-member districts.
 1994 – 
 The Ballpark in Arlington opens.
 Richard Greene Linear Park opens in honor of the mayor.
 Arlington Central Library is renamed George W. Hawkes Central Library after prominent newspaper publisher George W. Hawkes.
 Johnnie High's Country Music Revue moves into the old Arlington Theater.
 The Arlington Museum of Art opens in the old JCPenney building on Main Street.
 1995 – 
 The University of Texas at Arlington celebrates its 100-year anniversary.
 Downtown Arlington, Inc. is formed.
 1996 –
 Arlington Morning News begins publication.
 City website online.
 Tarrant County College Southeast Campus opens.
 River Legacy Living Science Center opens to the public.
 Amber Hagerman is abducted and killed after riding her bike on Abram Street, and the Amber alert is established and named after her.
 1997 – 
 Elzie Odom becomes Arlington's first African-American mayor, focusing on expanding education as well as theater and arts in downtown. 
 Texas Health Resources nonprofit established.
 A section of turf located behind Center Field at the Ballpark in Arlington is named Greene's Hill for the mayor's contributions to the Texas Rangers baseball club.
 1998 – Cooper House is destroyed in an accidental fire on Halloween night.
 1999 – Elzie Odom Athletic Center opens at 1601 N.E. Green Oaks Boulevard.
 2000 –
 Old Town Historic District opens.
 Population: 332,969.

21st century

 2001 –Eastern Star Home closes facilities.
 2002 –
 Mansfield Summit High School and Seguin High School open.
 AMC Parks cinema opens.
 Arlington voters overwhelmingly approve a street maintenance sales tax program that the city proposed.
 2003 – Robert Cluck becomes mayor.
 2004 – 
 Voters 'okay' a tax hike that helps pay for a brand new stadium for the Dallas Cowboys.
 Mansfield Timberview High School established.
 2005 - The commercial tree preservation ordinance is extended to residential developments.
 2006 – 
 Downtown Arlington Management Corporation established.
 Runaway Mine Train is designated an ACE Coaster Landmark by the American Coaster Enthusiasts.
 Arlington celebrates its 135th birthday.
 2007 – 
 UT Arlington becomes the second largest campus in the University of Texas system.
 The Highlands shopping district opens.
 Construction is set to begin on an upscale development called Glorypark by AT&T Stadium.
 2008 – 
 Opening night of the Levitt Pavilion for the Performing Arts in Arlington with more than 1,800 people in attendance.
 Plans for Glorypark by AT&T Stadium are shelved.
 2009 – 
 Cowboys Stadium opens.
 Texas Giant closes for renovations as the wooden coaster ages.
 2010 – Population: 365,438 city; 6,371,773 metro; 19,728,244 megaregion.
 2011 - 
 Texas Christkindl Market commemorates its first year during the holiday season.
 Pentatonix forms and wins The Sing-Off, founded by Martin High School alumni.
 New Texas Giant opens up as a hybrid wooden-steel coaster.
 2012 – 
 University of Texas's College Park Center opens.
 Pentatonix returns to their hometown to perform a free concert at the Levitt Pavilion, breaking the attendance record with 12,000 people attending.
 2013 – 
 Former Eastern Star Home is demolished.
 Metro Arlington Xpress (public transit) begins operating.
 Arlington becomes the Fall location for retro gaming convention Retropalooza.
 2014 – 
 Arlington changes its logo and slogan to "American Dream City."
 2015 – 
 W. Jeff Williams becomes mayor.
 George W. Hawkes Central Library is demolished after 40 years of service.
 The original Sam Houston High School building demolishes.
 2016 – 
 Proposition to build new stadium for Texas Rangers is passed.
 The City and the Arlington Museum of Art begin a public art project called "Stars of Texas" with painted star statues scattered around the city.
 Downtown Arlington is designated as a cultural district by the State of Texas.
 2017 – 
 AISD opens the Dan Dipert Career and Technical Center after it was approved in a 2014 bond.
 Officials breaks ground on the new Texas Rangers stadium.
 Ride-sharing company Via becomes the city's only public transportation service, replacing Metro Arlington Xpress.  First-year operations cost taxpayers $922,500.
 Texas Christkind Market combines with Enchant Christmas to create the Enchant Christmas Light Maze and Market for the next two years.
 2018 – 
 George W. Hawkes Central Library second location celebrates its grand opening.
 Arlington Convention Center re-opens as Esports Stadium Arlington & Expo Center, the largest dedicated esports facility in North America.
 Arlington citizens vote to implement term limits on the city council.
 Yosemite Sam & the Gold River Adventure at SFOT semi-permanently closes after a bad storm.
 2019 – 
 AISD opens the Arlington College and Career High School.
 Live! By Loews opens as a joint venture between Loews Hotels and the Texas Rangers to bring an upscale hospitality experience to the entertainment district.
 Arlington is chosen as the home of the National Medal of Honor Museum, set to be built in 2024.
 General Motors employees strike for 40 days for additional compensation and benefits.
 UTA receives funding to replace their School of Social Work building, the first Arlington High School building.
 Medical City Arlington opens their Medical City Women's Hospital.
 2020 –
 Globe Life Field celebrates a delayed opening for AISD high school graduation, and a few months later for a crowdless MLB game.
 Globe Life Field hosts the entirety of the World Series, the first time the World Series has played at a single location since 1944.
 2021 - 
 Via Rideshare service expands city-wide.  The annual taxpayer expense becomes $2.2 million.

See also
 National Register of Historic Places listings in Tarrant County, Texas
 Timelines of other cities in the North Texas area of Texas: Dallas, Denton, Fort Worth, Garland, Irving, Plano, Wichita Falls

References

Bibliography

 
 
 
 
  Janet L. Schmelzer, Where the West Begins: Fort Worth and Tarrant County (Northridge, California: Windsor, 1985)

External links

 
 
 
 
 

Arlington, Texas
arlington